The Lublin class or Projekt 767 are minelayer-landing ships designed and built in Poland for the Polish Navy, in service since 1989. Only five out of the twelve planned ships were built, by the Northern Shipyard in Gdańsk, due to the fall of Communism. They can carry up to 9 T-72 tanks or 17 transport vehicles such as the Star 266 and 135 equipped troops. They were designed to carry up to 134 naval mines. The ships are named after the chief cities of the Piast dynasty.

On 12 October 2007, ORP Lublin became an honorary citizen of Lublin.

Background
 was a Polish mine-laying vessel and, likely, the only heavy mine-laying vessel built.

List of ships

Gallery

References

Amphibious warfare vessel classes
Amphibious warfare vessels of the Polish Navy
 
Minelayers of the Polish Navy